Overton is a village between Wakefield and Huddersfield in West Yorkshire, England. Overton is conjoined at its north-east to the larger village of Middlestown.

Overton was historically called 'Over Shitlington', and was one of four villages in the township of 'Shitlington' in the civil parish of Thornhill. In 1881 Overton was in the county court district and Poor Law Union of Wakefield. Village occupations at the time included two farmers, a shopkeeper, the manager of "Cap House pit," and the landlords of The Reindeer and The Black Swan public houses. Shitlington was officially changed to Sitlington in 1929.

St Luke's Parish Church in Overton is part of the ecclesiastical parish of Middlestown with Netherton.

Overton is significant for the National Coal Mining Museum, situated on the A642. The former Caphouse Colliery was worked from at least 1789 until the coal was exhausted in 1985 when work was started to convert it to a museum.

See also
Listed buildings in Sitlington

References

External links

"Sitlington West Riding", A Vision of Britain Through Time. Retrieved 15 January 2015 
Coxley News - personal registrant web site for Netherton, Middlestown, Overton and Midgley
Wakefield Council

Villages in West Yorkshire
Geography of the City of Wakefield